The 1980–81 Yugoslav First Basketball League season was the 37th season of the Yugoslav First Basketball League, the highest professional basketball league in SFR Yugoslavia. The season ended with Partizan winning the league championship; despite finishing the season with an identical 19-3 record as Cibona, Partizan was better in their seasonal head-to-head, winning both of their contests during the season.

Notable events

Partizan vs. Cibona season series
The season was decided in two Partizan-Cibona games. First one was played in Zagreb during the first part of the season. The visiting team jumped out to an early 20+ point lead carried by Dragan Kićanović, Miško Marić, and Boban Petrović. However, in the second half, led by its center line — consisting of 32-year-old veteran Krešimir Ćosić who returned to Yugoslav League after two years in Italy and promising young prospect Andro Knego — Cibona annulled Partizan's first half lead. Still, Partizan held their nerve at the end, winning the game 94-95. Kićanović led all scorers with 32 points while his teammates Marić and Petrović contributed with 25 and 22 points, respectively. On the other side, Cibona's veteran center Ćosić scored 28 points while Knego added 26.

The second Partizan-Cibona game of the season was played during spring 1981 in Belgrade. It turned out to be almost a carbon copy of the first one. Cheered on by a large and boisterous home crowd, Partizan jumped out to an early lead of over 20 points again before Cibona again came back in the second half. Partizan again proved calmer in a tense finish with Boban Petrović making a clutch bank jump shot that won the game for the Belgrade club 91-87. Petrović and Kićanović led Partizan in this key contest with 26 points each while Arsenije Pešić added 14. In Cibona, Knego and Željko Pavličević led the scoring with 27 and 24 points, respectively while its two best players Aco Petrović and Ćosić had a poor shooting night with only 7 and 4 points, respectively.

Classification 

The winning roster of Partizan:
  Dragan Kićanović
  Boban Petrović
  Miško Marić
  Arsenije Pešić
  Dragan Todorić
  Dušan Kerkez
  Goran Despotović
  Milan Medić
  Milenko Savović
  Dragan Milutinović
  Nebojša Bukumirović
  Danko Cvjetićanin
  Dragan Kovačević

Coach:  Borislav Ćorković

Scoring leaders
 Branko Skroče (Zadar) - ___ points (35.4ppg)

Qualification in 1981-82 season European competitions 

FIBA European Champions Cup
 Partizan (champions)

FIBA Cup Winners' Cup
 Cibona (Cup winners)

FIBA Korać Cup
 Zadar (3rd)
 Šibenka (4th)
 Crvena Zvezda (5th)
 Iskra Olimpija (6th)

References

Yugoslav First Basketball League seasons
 
Yugoslav